The Sony α7S II (model ILCE-7SM2) is a 12.2-megapixel full-frame mirrorless interchangeable-lens camera made by Sony.

The α7S II is offered as a body only or in a package with a Sony FE 28-70mm F3.5-5.6 OSS zoom lens. It was succeeded by the Sony α7S III in October 2020.

Features

Image features
The α7S II features a 35mm (35.6 x 23.8 mm) full-frame Exmor CMOS sensor capable of capturing approximately 12.2 effective megapixels.

Autofocus and metering
The camera's 169-point autofocus sensors use contrast-detection AF to capture and record.

ISO
For still images, the α7S II's ISO is 100–102400 with expansion down to ISO 50 and up to ISO 409600 equivalent. For movies, the α7S II's ISO is 100-102400 equivalent with expansion down to ISO 100 and up to ISO 409600 equivalent. For still images or movies on auto setting, the camera's ISO is 100–12800 with selectable lower and upper limits.

Shutter
The α7S II's shutter speed range is 30 s to 1/8,000 s for still images. For bulb movies, the shutter speed range is 1/4 s (1/3 s step) to 1/8,000 s.

The camera has an approximate maximum continuous shooting speed of 5.0 frames per second in Speedy Priority Continuous shooting drive mode and a shooting speed of 2.5 frames per second in Continuous shooting drive mode.

Ergonomics and functions
The α7S II has a TFT LCD screen with a size of 7.5 cm (3 inches) and resolution of 1,228,800 dots with an adjustable tilt angle of 107 degrees up and 41 degrees down (approximate). The OLED electronic viewfinder has a resolution of 2,360,000 dots and a .78x magnification.

The camera additionally has built-in Wi-Fi with NFC compatibility.

Video
The camera can record 4K UHD (QFHD: 3840 x 2160) internally in full frame format. The camera allows for movie image size to  be set, as well as the frame rate per second, and compression method.

The Possession of Hannah Grace was filmed entirely using the A7S II

Firmware update
On , Sony announced batch firmware updates for the α9 and α7 line of cameras including firmware version 3.01 for the α7S II; its main change was improving overall stability of the camera body.

International Space Station

In , Japan's national aero-space agency,  JAXA, installed a Sony α7S II outside the International Space Station's KIBO Japanese Experiment Module after determining it would be durable enough to withstand the vacuum of outer space. According to Sony, the a7S II captured the first 4K footage in space using a commercial level camera. In order to mitigate the temperature extremes of outer space, the camera mount is equipped with a heater and radiator. Sony stated that the camera body was not modified but the software was modified to include the ability for full remote control from inside the Space Station. JAXA selected the Sony FE PZ 28-135mm F4 G OSS lens to capture images and record video for the purpose of this assignment.

Accessories
According to Sony's website, the α7S II model comes equipped with:
 Sony ILCE-7SM2 Camera Body
 Battery Pack NP-FW50 (rechargeable)
 Battery Charger BC-VW1
 AC Adapter AC-UUD11
 Neck/Shoulder Strap
 Micro-USB Cable and Cable Protector

See also
List of cameras on the International Space Station
List of Sony E-mount cameras
Sony α7II

References

External links
 Product page
 

α7S II
Cameras introduced in 2015
Full-frame mirrorless interchangeable lens cameras
Personal cameras and photography in space